India won three gold, seven silver and 23 bronze to finish a commendable 10th in the 2009 Asian Martial Arts Games. For India, all the three gold were won by women and two came in kurash, a form of upright jacket wrestling originated in Uzbekistan.

Shally Manral gave India their first gold in the women's 52 kg half-weight category in kurash, while Laxmi Tyagi scored second in the 52 kg low kick kick-boxing. Jaya Chaudhary rounded off India's campaign with a gold in the women's 72 kg half-heavy division in kurash to help the side finish in the top 10 bracket.

Medal summary

Medal table

Medalists

References

External links
 Official Website

2009 Asian Martial Arts Games
2009 in Indian sport
India at the Asian Indoor Games